The SNCB/NMBS HLE 18 (Siemens class  ES60U3) are a series of four axle Bo′Bo′ multivoltage electric Siemens EuroSprinter locomotives ordered in two batches of sixty in 2006 and 2008.

The locomotives were supplied for use by SNCB/NMBS (Belgian national railways) on passenger services.

96 of the class form the HLE 18 class, 24 units fitted with an automatic central coupler form the SNCB HLE 19 class.

History
An order for 60 units, value €211 million, was placed in December 2006 for delivery between January 2009 and June 2010. In December 2008, an option to order 60 more locomotives was exercised for an amount of € 222M, for delivery between June 2010 and April 2012.

The locomotives were ordered to replace Belgian Railways Class 13, Class 21 and Class 27 locomotives on passenger intercity services. The Class 13 were mostly displaced on freight trains while the Class 21 and 27 took over slower passenger trains; this allowed the withdrawal of outdated Belgian Railways Class 23 and 26 locomotives as well as the younger but troublesome class 20.

Locomotive number 1860 was officially presented at InnoTrans in 2008. The first unit, number 1801 was transferred to the Velim railway test circuit for testing in December  2008.

On March 3, 2009, the first unit (roadnumber 1802) was officially delivered to SNCB/NMBS for test and homologation purpose. Homologation issues delayed commercial introduction (originally planned for the summer schedule - May 2011), as a result Siemens was obliged to pay the maximum amount of penalties (€21.12 million).

In July 2011 the first revenue earning Intercity services ran, under temporary approval. The type received homologation certification for use in Belgium in late 2011.

References

Sources

External links

National Railway Company of Belgium locomotives
3000 V DC locomotives
25 kV AC locomotives
Electric locomotives of Belgium
Railway locomotives introduced in 2009
Bo′Bo′ locomotives
Siemens locomotives
Standard gauge locomotives of Belgium
Bo′Bo′ electric locomotives of Europe